Clarksburg College was a school in Clarksburg, Missouri beginning in 1877.  It was originally named Clarksburg Academy.  The first principal was W. J. Hawkins.  

By the 1890s it was granting degrees that allowed students to then go to "Central College", now known as Central Methodist University.  Among other subjects it taught education and business.

Sources
"A Brief History of Clarksburg"

Educational institutions established in 1877
Defunct private universities and colleges in Missouri
Buildings and structures in Moniteau County, Missouri
1877 establishments in Missouri